AntiVermins is a rogue security program dating from about 2007 that claims to be a commercial spyware-removal utility, when in fact it is, itself, adware-advertised. The software installs itself, without consent, in the user's computer and registry. It then sends messages such as "system error, buy this software to fix" or "your system is infected with spyware, buy AntiVermins to clean it", redirecting the user to the software's homepage where he or she is prompted to buy it for about $50. As for the homepage itself, the English version seems like a professional page, but the versions of the page in other languages appear to have been translated using machine translation software. Anti Vermins made over $100,000 by tricking people into buying it.

Characteristics and behavior
Poor scan reporting
False positives
Deceptive advertising within the application
Fake critical infection alerts

References

External links
Summary of AntiVermins by Symantec
	

Rogue software